Belo is a small settlement in the Municipality of Brda in the Littoral region of Slovenia, close to the border with Italy.

References

External links 

Belo on Geopedia

Populated places in the Municipality of Brda